The Moldovan National Youth Orchestra (MNYO) is the national youth orchestra of Moldova. Established in 2011 on the initiative of Andriano Marian, it consists of 200 young instrumentalists with an average age of 22. It is an associated member of the European Federation of National Youth Orchestras.

The orchestra made its debut at Young Euro Classic in 2017.

See also 
 List of youth orchestras

References 

Music education organizations
National youth orchestras
Moldovan orchestras
European youth orchestras
Musical groups established in 2011
2011 establishments in Moldova